St Mary's Abbey, Melrose is a partly ruined monastery of the Cistercian order in Melrose, Roxburghshire, in the Scottish Borders. It was founded in 1136 by Cistercian monks at the request of King David I of Scotland and was the chief house of that order in the country until the Reformation. It was headed by the abbot or commendator of Melrose. Today the abbey is maintained by Historic Environment Scotland as a scheduled monument.

The east end of the abbey was completed in 1146. Other buildings in the complex were added over the next 50 years. The abbey was built in the Gothic manner and in the form of a St. John's Cross. A considerable portion of the abbey is now in ruins. A structure dating from 1590 is maintained as a museum open to the public.

Alexander II and other Scottish kings and nobles are buried at the abbey. A lead container believed to hold the embalmed heart of Robert the Bruce was found in 1921 below the Chapter House site; it was found again in a 1998 excavation and documented in records of his death. The rest of his body is buried in Dunfermline Abbey.

The abbey is known for its many carved decorative details, including likenesses of saints, dragons, gargoyles and plants. On one of the abbey's stairways is an inscription by John Morow, a master mason, which says, Be halde to ye hende ("Keep in mind, the end, your salvation"). This has become the motto of the town of Melrose.

History

Old Melrose
An earlier monastery was founded by, then later dedicated to, Saint Aidan of Lindisfarne on a site about two miles (3.5 km) east of Melrose Abbey. This was shortly before his death in 651 at Bamburgh. Set in a bend of the River Tweed, a graveyard marks the site. Saint Cuthbert (died 687), who grew up nearby, trained at Old Melrose abbey. He was prior from 662 before he moved to Lindisfarne (Holy Island). Æthelweald was a novice at Lindisfarne when Cuthbert became bishop. He attended Cuthbert on some of his missionary journeys, and witnessed at least one of his miracles. He later became prior and then abbot at Melrose. Saint Oduvald (died 698) was a Scottish nobleman who followed Cuthbert as abbot.
The visionary Dryhthelm was also a monk there in the early eighth century. The abbey site was raided by Kenneth I of Scotland in 839.

Cistercian abbey

Melrose was the first Cistercian abbey in Scotland. King David I wanted the new abbey to be built on the same site, but the Cistercians insisted that the land was not good enough for farming and selected the current site. It was said to have been built in ten years. The church of the convent was dedicated to St. Mary (like all Cistercian houses) on 28 July 1146. The abbey became the mother church of the order in Scotland. Its first community came from Rievaulx Abbey, the North Yorkshire house colonised from Cîteaux.

In the 12th century, around Melrose, the Cistercians implemented new farming techniques and marketed Melrose wool throughout the great trading ports across northern Europe. A town slowly grew up around the abbey. During a time of famine four thousand starving people were fed by the monastery for three months.

The monastery had 100 monks, exclusive of the abbot and dignitaries. The privileges and possessions of the abbey were very extensive. Its founder David endowed it with the lands of Melrose, Eildon, and other places; and the right of fishery on the River Tweed. Succeeding monarchs increased their property. The house was famed for its wealth, for many of its abbots were men of distinction and honour. Waltheof of Melrose, stepson of King David and at one time prior of Kirkham, was abbot of Melrose from 1148 to 1159. He endowed Melrose with a reputation for sanctity and learning which placed it on a par with houses such as Fountains and Rievaulx and made it the premier abbey in Scotland. The tomb of St. Waltheof, in the chapter house, later became the focus of pilgrimage.

One of the earliest accounts of the Magna Carta agreement reached at Runnymede in 1215 is found in the Chronicle of Melrose Abbey. Melrose was located on one of the main roads running from Edinburgh to the south making it particularly vulnerable to attack. In 1322, the town was attacked by the army of Edward II, and much of the abbey was destroyed. It was rebuilt by order of King Robert the Bruce, with Sir James Douglas being the principal auditor of finance for the project. In 1385, the abbey was burned by the army of Richard II of England, "partly because of support for the Avignon Pope Clement VII" he forced the army of Robert II of Scotland back to Edinburgh. It was rebuilt over a period of about 100 years – construction was still unfinished when James IV visited in 1504.

From 1541, the abbacy was held by a series of commendators. In 1544, as English armies raged across Scotland in an effort to force the Scots to allow the infant Mary, Queen of Scots to marry the son of Henry VIII, the abbey was again badly damaged and was never fully repaired. On 29 September 1549 an English soldier discovered the pyx that had been suspended over the high altar and gave it to the Earl of Rutland. War damage led to its decline as a working monastery. The last abbot was James Stuart (an illegitimate son of James V), who died in 1557. In 1590, Melrose's last monk died.

The abbey withstood one final assault, and some of its walls still show the marks of cannon fire after having been bombarded by Oliver Cromwell's troops during the English Civil War. In 1618, a portion of the abbey's church was converted into a parish church for the surrounding town. A plain vault was inserted into the crossing, removing the original ribbed vaulting in the central section. It was used until 1810 when a new church was erected in the town. In 1812, a stone coffin was exhumed from the aisle in the abbey's south chancel. Some speculated the remains were those of Michael Scot, the philosopher and "wizard."

At the beginning of the nineteenth century, Sir Walter Scott was appointed Sheriff-Depute of Roxburghshire. In 1822, with the financial assistance of the Duke of Buccleuch, Sir Walter supervised the extensive repair work that was to preserve the ruins. In 1918, the duke gave the ruins to the state, by which time the abbey had undergone further restoration and repair. It is now in the care of Historic Environment Scotland.

Robert the Bruce

Robert Bruce's heart is said to have been buried in the church, perhaps brought back from a crusade with the body of Lord Douglas in either 1330 or 1331. The position was marked by a small metal plaque.

In 1996, an archaeological excavation on the site unearthed a conical lead container and an engraved copper plaque that read "The enclosed leaden casket containing a heart was found beneath Chapter House floor, March 1921, by His Majesty's Office of Works." The casket was investigated by AOC archaeology in Leith and contained a still recognisable human heart in a thick black liquor. As there are no records of anyone else's heart being buried at Melrose it was presumed to be that of Robert the Bruce. The container was reburied at Melrose Abbey on 22 June 1998 under a memorial stone.

There is no way to prove conclusively whether the heart belonged to King Robert. There is no record of any other heart being buried on the site; however, the Chapter House would be an unusual location for a king's heart to be buried: most high-status burials would have happened next to the altar.

Description

The abbey is laid out on a traditional east–west axis. The west section is almost wholly absent other than its foundations. The eastern section is more intact. A graveyard serving the local community lies to the south and southeast of the abbey. The majority of stones date from the 19th century. The abbey is the only Scottish abbey to still retain some of its original floor tiles. The northern cloisters are equally erased to foundation level.

Abbots
 Eata first abbot, a pupil of Aidan, Bishop of Lindisfarne.
 Richard was abbot in 1473.
 Robert was abbot in 1519.
 Thomas Ker was abbot in 1524.
 William Ker commendator (died before 31 July 1566).
 Michael Balfour commendator in 1568.
 James Douglas, abbot and commendator from 1 May 1569 to 9 December 1606.

Gallery

Burials

 Jocelin (Bishop of Glasgow)
 Waltheof of Melrose
 William de Bondington – Bishop of Glasgow
 William Douglas, Lord of Liddesdale
 William Douglas, 1st Earl of Douglas
 James Douglas, 2nd Earl of Douglas
 Philip de Valognes, Chamberlain of Scotland
 Alexander II of Scotland
 Alexander Ormiston Curle
 Sir Brian Layton
 Sir David Brewster (1781–1868), inventor of the Kaleidoscope
 Walter, 8th Duke of Buccleuch
 Mary, Duchess of Buccleuch
 John, 9th Duke of Buccleuch

Tributes
Sir Walter Scott described Melrose Abbey in one of his poems, "The Lay of the Last Minstrel, Canto Second".

A Presbyterian congregation in Bloomfield Hills, Michigan, has built what may be the last Gothic cathedral in the U.S. and patterned it after Melrose Abbey.

The abbey was built in the video game Minecraft by 4J Studios in 2015. The build was featured one of the game's official tutorial worlds (TU31), the one for version 1.8.

Tourism
The abbey is part of five other abbeys and historic sights through Scotland on Borders Abbeys Way walk. In 2019 the site received 61,325 visitors.

A report in February 2023 stated that "conservation work means that the church itself is closed off to visitors, but the cloisters, museum and gardens are still open".

See also
Abbot of Melrose, for a list of abbots and commendators
List of religious houses in Scotland
List of places in the Scottish Borders
List of places in Scotland

References

External links

The Mirror of Literature, Amusement, and Instruction, No. 290, Saturday, December 29, 1827, available from Project Gutenberg
Engraving of Melrose Abbey by James Fittler in the digitised copy of Scotia Depicta, or the antiquities, castles, public buildings, noblemen and gentlemen's seats, cities, towns and picturesque scenery of Scotland, 1804 at National Library of Scotland

Buildings and structures completed in 1146
Christian monasteries established in the 12th century
Ruins in the Scottish Borders
Cistercian monasteries in Scotland
Scheduled Ancient Monuments in the Scottish Borders
Wars of Scottish Independence
Religious organizations established in 1136
1609 disestablishments in Scotland
Museums in the Scottish Borders
Religious museums in Scotland
1146 establishments in Scotland
Tourist attractions in the Scottish Borders
Ruined abbeys and monasteries
Historic Scotland properties in the Scottish Borders
Burial sites of the House of Balliol
Melrose, Scottish Borders
Ruined abbeys in the Scottish Borders